Emanuel Sueyro (1587–1629), Lord of Voorde, Knight of Christ, was an intelligence agent and historian in the 17th-century Habsburg Netherlands.

Life
Of Portuguese descent, Emanuel Sueyro was born and brought up in Antwerp. He translated classical and more recent Latin histories into Spanish, and wrote a two-part history of the Low Countries, Anales de Flandes (1624).

He was head of a secret intelligence network in the Habsburg Netherlands, reporting to Philip III of Spain. For this work he was awarded a knightship in the Order of Christ. He was lord of Voorde by purchase.

Writings

Histories
 Descripcion breve del pais baxo (Antwerp, Gerard Wolsschaten, 1622)
 Anales de Flandes (Antwerp, Peter and Jan Bellerus, 1624), dedicated to Philip IV of Spain

Translations
 Tacitus, Las obras de C. Cornelio Tacito (Antwerp, heirs of Peter Bellerus, 1613), dedicated to Isabel Clara Eugenia
 Sallust, Obras de Caio Crispo Sallustio (Antwerp, G. Wolsschaten & H. Aerts for Jan Van Keerbergen, 1615), dedicated to Don Juan de Mendoza, Duke of the Infantado
 Herman Hugo, Sitio de Breda rendida a las armas del rey don Phelipe IV (Antwerp, Plantin office, 1627), dedicated to Ambrogio Spinola

References

External links
 Translation of Tacitus (1613), at Google Books.
 Translation of Sallust (1615), at Google Books.
 Anales de Flandes part 1 (1624), at Google Books.
 Anales de Flandes, part 2 (1624) at Google Books.
 Sitio de Breda (1627) at Google Books.

1587 births
1629 deaths
17th-century translators
Latin–Spanish translators
17th-century historians from the Holy Roman Empire
Spymasters
Spanish people of the Eighty Years' War